The Kennewick–Pasco–Richland metropolitan area—colloquially referred to as the Tri-Cities metropolitan area, and officially known as the Kennewick–Richland, WA Metropolitan Statistical Area—is a metropolitan area consisting of Benton and Franklin counties in Washington state, anchored by the cities of Kennewick, Pasco, and Richland (the Tri-Cities). As of July 1, 2021, the U.S. Census Bureau estimates the population of the metropolitan area to be 308,293, making it the third-largest metropolitan area located entirely in Washington, after the Seattle metropolitan area and the Spokane metropolitan area. Although it is located outside of the metropolitan area, the CDP of Burbank (located in Walla Walla County) is part of the Tri-Cities urban area.

The Tri-Cities metro area is a constituent piece of the Kennewick-Richland-Walla Walla combined statistical area, which consists of the Tri-Cities (Benton and Franklin Counties) along with the Walla Walla metropolitan area (Walla Walla County).

Communities

Over 50,000 inhabitants
 Kennewick (principal city)
 Pasco (principal city)
 Richland (principal city)

10,001 to 50,000 inhabitants
 West Richland

5,001 to 10,000 inhabitants
 Prosser
 Connell

5,000 inhabitants or fewer
 Benton City
 Mesa
 Kahlotus

Unincorporated places

 Acton
 Badger
 Basin City
 Eltopia
 Finley
 Grosscup (now part of West Richland)
 Harder
 Highland
 Kiona
 Ledbeder (now part of West Richland)
 Longview
 North Prosser
 Paterson
 Plymouth
 West Pasco
 Whitstran

Ghost towns
Ainsworth
Berrian
Cactus
East White Bluffs
Gibbon
Hanford (depopulated in March 1943)
Horse Heaven
Hover
Wahluke
White Bluffs (depopulated in March 1943)
Yellepit

Demographics

As of 2020, there were 294,396 people and 100,336 households residing within the MSA. The racial makeup of the MSA was 60% White, 32% Hispanic, 3% Asian, 2% Black, 0% Native, and 0% Islander.

The median income for a household in the MSA was $70,545. The per capita income for the MSA was $31,610.

References

Metropolitan areas of Washington (state)